Andy McMillan may refer to:
 Andy McMillan (footballer)
 Andy McMillan (designer)

See also
 Andy MacMillan, Scottish architect, educator, writer and broadcaster